Na Gbewa (also known as Nedega or Kulu Gbagha) is, traditionally, the founder of the Kingdom of Dagbon, in what is now northern Ghana. His sons and his daughters are credited with founding several states.

References

Further reading
 
 
 
 

16th-century Ghanaian people
Ghanaian royalty
Dagomba people